The 2001 World Polo Championship was played in Melbourne Australia during April 2001 and was won by Brazil. This event brought together eight teams from around the world in the Werribee Park.

Final Match

Final rankings

External links
FIP World Championship V

2001
Polo competitions in Australia
Sports competitions in Melbourne
P
2001 in polo